Fang Island was an American indie rock band formed in Providence, Rhode Island, and based in Brooklyn, New York. The group consisted of the guitarists Jason Bartell and Chris Georges, the bass guitarist Brock Hengin and the drummer Marc St. Sauveur.

Biography 
Fang Island began in 2005 as an art project with original members, Philip Curcuru, Chris Georges and Pete Watts, while attending Rhode Island School of Design. 
They were later joined by Bartell, St. Sauveur, Jacober and the guitarist Nick Sadler, a former member of the band Daughters. 
Fang Island took its name from an article in The Onion. Bartell recalled, "I think it was just a funny blip about Donald Rumsfeld having a secret hideaway, and it was on Fang Island."

The band describes its sound as "everyone high-fiving everyone" 
and their goal, according to Bartell, is to "make music for people who like music".

The band independently released Day of the Great Leap in 2007, followed by an EP, Sky Gardens, in November 2008. Their song "The Absolute Place" was remixed by Chris Keating of Yeasayer in 2009. 
Fang Island was named one of the year's top 10 albums by Brian Cook of The Stranger. 
The album's lead single "Daisy", which has an electro-organ introduction and chanted vocals, 
was played during a series of commercials promoting the MTV reality show The Buried Life. 
Adam Pfleider of AbsolutePunk described it as a "wild party" that "listeners will want to relive ... over and over again". 
Dan Goldin of Decoy Music praised the album for "successfully combining the luster of indie pop music with the technical eccentricities of progressive rock". 
Ian Cohen in Pitchfork Media called the music on Fang Island "honest and life-affirming and infectious". 
In 2010, Fang Island performed at the SXSW music festival in Austin, Texas, 
and were named by the social networking analytics site Next Big Sound as the artists who experienced the fastest growth in online fandom during the festival. 
While in Austin, the band also recorded three songs for a Daytrotter session. 
Fang Island entered the Billboard Heatseekers Albums chart in April 2010.

In a 2012 interview with New York Music News, Bartell admitted the happy undertones of the band's music, saying,  "I am pretty ding-dong-doodily-delighted, all the time."

Their song "Chompers" from the album Major is a playable track on the video game Rocksmith 2014

Fang Island quietly disbanded in 2015. Bartell continues to produce new music as Mythless.

Band members 

Current
 Jason Bartell - guitar, vocals  (2005–2015)
 Chris Georges - guitar, keyboards, vocals  (2005–2015)
 Brock Hengin - bass guitar, vocals (2013–2015)
 Marc St. Sauveur - drums, vocals (2009–2015)

Former
 Philip Curcuru - bass guitar, vocals (2005–2011)
 Pete Watts - drums (2005–2009)
 Nicholas Andrew Sadler - guitar, keyboards, vocals (2007–2011)
 Michael Jacober - bass guitar, keyboards, vocals (2011–2013)

Timeline

Discography
Albums

EPs

Music videos

References

External links
 
 Fang Island at Sargent House
 The Onion article from which Fang Island took its name
 Fang Island on Waste Water Music (German site)

Indie rock musical groups from Rhode Island
Musical groups established in 2005
Rhode Island School of Design alumni in music